The Università per stranieri Dante Alighieri di Reggio Calabria, often simply abbreviated as "Unistrad" is a private university founded in 2007 in Reggio Calabria, Italy.

History

Organization

Faculties
These are the 2 faculties in which the university is divided into:

Faculty of Education Sciences

Rectors
The Rector is the highest academic authority.

Salvatore Berlingò

See also 
 List of Italian universities

References

External links 
University Website (Homepage)

Universities in Italy
2007 establishments in Italy